The 2016 Zimbabwe Premier Soccer League is the 37th season of top-tier football in Zimbabwe. The season began on 1 April 2016 when How Mine took on newly promoted Bulawayo City at White City Stadium. CAPS United won their fifth league championship and first in 11 years.

Attendances

Highlanders F.C. drew the highest average home attendance in the league in 2016, with an average attendance of 5,614. The previous year, they drew an average home attendance of 7,276 for domestic league games. The league's average attendance in 2016 was 920 (441,608 total attendance).

Teams
A total of 16 teams are contesting the league, including 12 sides from the 2015 season and four promoted from the 2015 Zimbabwe Division 1, Border Strikers, Bulawayo City, Mutare City Rovers and Ngezi Platinum. On the other hand, Buffaloes, Dongo Sawmills, Flame Lilly and Wha Wha were the last four teams of the 2015 season and will play in the Zimbabwe Division 1 for the 2016 season. Chicken Inn are the defending champions from the 2015 season.

Stadiums and locations

Results

League table

Result table
All teams play in a double round robin system (home and away).

Positions by round

Season statistics

Goals

Top scorers

Scoring
First goal of the season: Pascal Manhanga for How Mine against Bulawayo City (3 April 2016)

References

2016 in African association football leagues
Zimbabwe Premier Soccer League